Transgender organizations seek to promote understanding and acceptance, both legally and socially, of transgender persons.

International
 International Foundation for Gender Education (IFGE)
 GATE
 World Professional Association for Transgender Health (WPATH)

Europe
 Transgender Europe (TGEU)

Armenia 
 Right Side NGO

Belgium 
 Genres Pluriels

United Kingdom 
 All About Trans
 The Gender Trust
 Mermaids
 Press for Change
 Trans Media Watch

Asia

India
 Sahodari Foundation
 Humsafar Trust
 Sangama
 Sappho for Equality

Iraq 

 Rasan

Taiwan
 Taiwan TG Butterfly Garden

Australia
Transgender Victoria
Zoe Belle Gender Collective

North America

United States
 Audre Lorde Project
 El/La Para TransLatinas
 GenderPAC
 Gender Justice League
 Gender Rights Maryland
 Ingersoll Gender Center
 International Foundation for Gender Education
 Maryland Coalition for Trans Equality
 Massachusetts Transgender Political Coalition
 National Center for Transgender Equality
 National Transgender Advocacy Coalition
 Street Transvestite Action Revolutionaries
 Sylvia Rivera Law Project
 Tennessee Transgender Political Coalition
 TGI Justice Project
 Trans-e-motion
 Transcending Boundaries Conference
 Transgender Archive
 Transgender Foundation of America
 Transgender Law Center
 Transgender Law and Policy Institute
 Transgender Oral History Project
 Trans March
 Trans Student Educational Resources

Canada

 Egale Canada

Africa

Kenya
 Gay and Lesbian Coalition of Kenya

Morocco
 Kif-Kif

Tunisia 
 Shams

Uganda 
 Sexual Minorities Uganda (SMUG)

See also

 Transgender rights
 LGBT rights by country or territory
 List of transgender-related topics
 List of transgender publications

Transgender-rights organizations
 
Transgender-related lists
Transgender rights